Phumin Kaewta (born 12 March 1995) is a Thai professional footballer who plays as a winger for Thai League 1 club Muangthong United.

References

External links
P. Kaewta, Soccerway.
, Phumin Kaetwa, livesoccer888.com
Phumin Kaetwa, www.7m.com.cn

Phumin Kaewta
Phumin Kaewta
Association football midfielders
1995 births
Living people
Phumin Kaewta
Phumin Kaewta